Indianola Forest Historic District is a historic district in the University District of Columbus, Ohio. The district lies east of the Ohio State University. Architectural styles of the houses in the district include Craftsman, Tudor Revival, and Dutch Colonial Revival.

The district was developed at the turn of the 20th century, with most land laid out between 1873 and 1908, and most structures constructed by 1913. The district was a streetcar suburb of Columbus, mostly with single-family houses, most of which have since been converted to contain multiple units. The historic district was established through listing on the Columbus Register of Historic Properties in 1987.

References

External links
 

1987 establishments in Ohio
Columbus Register properties
Historic districts in Columbus, Ohio